Doris Turner may refer to:
 Doris Turner (cricketer)
 Doris Turner (politician)